Dickeyville is an unincorporated community in Owen Township, Warrick County, in the U.S. state of Indiana.

History
A post office was established at Dickeyville in 1884, and remained in operation until 1903. The community was named after the Dickey family of settlers.

Geography

Notes

Unincorporated communities in Warrick County, Indiana
Unincorporated communities in Indiana